Broflanilide is a complex, polycyclic, organohalogen insecticide which provides a novel mode of action (MoA).

Mode of action
Upon its discovery by Mitsui Chemicals, Insecticide Resistance Action Committee (IRAC) created the new MoA Group 30 for Broflanilide. Broflanilide is a meta-diamide GABA-gated Cl channel allosteric modulator. This - along with isoxazolines providing the same MoA, so far only fluxametamide - constitute the new MoA Group 30 in the IRAC classification scheme.

Advantages
No cross-resistance with existing MoAs.
Shows high effectiveness against wireworms.
Not systemic.

Environmental Hazards
The EPA has stated that Broflanilide is "Likely to be Carcinogenic to Humans".

Broflanilide meets the EPA Working Definition of PFAS. Note that "EPA considers any level of PFAS to be potentially toxicologically significant".

Products
Products were registered in the United States in January, 2021, and in Canada. It is being sold under the brand names Cimegra (BASF) and Teraxxa (BASF, the seed treatment form).

References

Insecticides
Benzamides
Trifluoromethyl compounds
Bromoarenes
Fluoroarenes